The 1880 United States presidential election in Kentucky took place on November 2, 1880. All contemporary thirty-eight states were part of the 1880 United States presidential election. Kentucky voters chose twelve electors to the Electoral College, which selected the president and vice president.

Background and vote
Ever since the Civil War, Kentucky had been shaped politically by divisions created by that war between secessionist, Democratic counties and Unionist, Republican ones, although the state as a whole leaned Democratic throughout this era and the GOP would never carry the state during the Third Party System at either presidential or gubernatorial level. Following Samuel J. Tilden’s 24-point victory in the state in 1876, the tobacco-growing Jackson Purchase and Western Coal Field were affected by the Greenback movement. This aimed to restore the fiat money system used to pay for the Civil War, in order to pay off farmer’s debts. It also was aimed at regulating the railroads which the western landowners – many former slaveholders – saw as siphoning the profit from their cash crop economy.

The Greenback movement managed to carry 8.3 percent of the vote in the 1879 gubernatorial election, but a rebound in tobacco prices and the adoption of some key elements of the Greenback platform by Democrats ensured that this decline was arrested and Greenback nominee James B. Weaver won only 4.39 percent of Kentucky’s ballots. Weaver did best in the regions where the Greenback insurgency was always strongest, but received no votes at all in fourteen of Kentucky’s 117 counties (most of those lying in the Eastern Coalfield). Democratic nominee Winfield Scott Hancock thus comfortably carried the state, although his margin was only two-thirds that of Tilden. , this is the last occasion when Rockcastle County voted for a Democratic presidential candidate.

Results

Results by county

Notes

References

Kentucky
1880
1880 Kentucky elections